Lynn J. "Jim" Scoggins (July 9, 1891 – August 16, 1923) was a Major League Baseball pitcher. In one career game, he had a 0–1 record, giving up one run and one walk. He batted and threw left-handed.

Scoggins was born in Killeen, Texas and died in Columbia, South Carolina.

External links

1891 births
1923 deaths
Chicago White Sox players
Major League Baseball pitchers
Baseball players from Texas
Wichita Falls Drillers players
Hugo Hugoites players
Lincoln Railsplitters players
Lincoln Tigers players
Los Angeles Angels (minor league) players
Dallas Giants players
Columbia Comers players